The Sarawak Government is an authority governing Sarawak, one of the Borneo states of Malaysia, and is based in Kuching, the state capital. The state government adheres to and is created by both the Federal Constitution of Malaysia, the supreme law of Malaysia, and the Constitution of the State of Sarawak, the supreme law of the State.

The state government has only two branches: executive and legislative. Sarawak has no judiciary branch due to the federalisation of the court system in Malaysia. Although Sarawak has jurisdictions over Sharia and Native Courts (and their respective laws), both courts are still considered parts of the state executive branch.

Legislative 

The state legislature consists of only a unicameral house called the State Legislative Assembly. All 82 members of the Assembly are elected from single-member districts by universal adult suffrage. The Assembly follows a multi-party system, and the governing body is elected through a first-past-the-post system. The state, however, may appoint up to six nominated members of the Assembly based on conditions provided by the state constitution.

By law, the Assembly has a maximum mandate of five years. The Governor may dissolve the state legislature at any time and usually does so upon the advice of the Premier.

Executive

Cabinet 
Executive power vested in the Cabinet led by the Premier. The State Constitution stipulates that the Premier must be a member of the State Legislative Assembly who, in the opinion of the Yang di-Pertua Negeri, commands a majority in the State Legislative Assembly. The Cabinet is chosen among members of the State Legislative Assembly and is responsible to that body. The executive branch of the government consists of the Premier as the head of the government, followed by the various ministers of the Cabinet.

State departments, agencies and companies 
Since 15 February 2022, Sarawak Government comprises the following ministries, which subsequently divided to following agencies:

Head of government 

The Premier of Sarawak, formerly the Chief Minister of Sarawak, is the indirectly elected head of government of Sarawak. He is officially appointed by the Governor, who in His Excellency's judgement is likely to command the confidence of the majority of the members of State Legislative Assembly. He heads the State Cabinet, whose members are appointed by the Yang di-Pertua Negeri on the advice of the Premier. The Premier and his Cabinet shall be collectively responsible to State Legislative Assembly. The Premier's Department is the body and ministry in which the Premier exercises its functions and powers.

Relationship with Malaysian federal government
Relationship of Sarawak state government with federal government of Malaysia are generally cozy except during 1966 Sarawak constitutional crisis when the then Sarawak chief minister Stephen Kalong Ningkan went into conflicts on various issues pertaining to the usage of Malay language in Sarawak, expatriate issue in Sarawak civil service, and appointment of Governor of Sarawak. The Parliament of Malaysia then used emergency powers to amend the constitution of Sarawak to facilitate the removal of Ningkan from office. In September 1966, Tawi Sli was installed as the new chief minister who was more acceptable to the federal government. However, his cabinet minister, Abdul Taib Mahmud dominated most of the decision making. In 1970, Abdul Rahman Ya'kub was considered as the first federal "proxy" to be installed as the third chief minister of Sarawak for his undivided loyalty to the federal government. In 1981, Abdul Taib Mahmud was installed as the fourth chief minister. The federal government adopted "hands off" approach as long as Sarawak parties consistently delivers overwhelming number of parliamentary seats to the federal government.

In 2008 Malaysian general election, the federal government lost two-third majority in parliament. This makes the federal more reliant on support from the east Malaysian states of Sabah and Sarawak to cling on power. Both east Malaysian states started to ask for more representatives in the Malaysian federal cabinet and more budget allocations. Adenan Satem, after took over the chief minister post in 2014, had asked for greater autonomy and empowerment from federal government to recognise Sarawak Independence Day on 22 July 1963, increase in oil royalty from 5% to 20%, and greater autonomy as enshrined in Constitution of Malaysia, and re-examine the documents such as Malaysia Agreement, Inter Governmental Committee and Cobbold Commission reports. This is because the federal government had "shortchanged" Sarawak throughout its 50 years within Malaysia; despite Sarawak is rich in natural resources, its basic infrastructure is still lacking and poorly maintained. Adenan also made English as the second official language of Sarawak (first official language being the Malay language) and recognised Unified Examination Certificate (UEC), in contrast to federal government policy that made the Malay language the sole official language of Malaysia and refused to recognise UEC certificate.  

Abang Abdul Rahman Johari Abang Openg continued Adenan policy of demanding more autonomy for Sarawak after he took over the chief minister post in January 2017. In 2018, Abang Johari decided to pull out all of his affiliated political parties from the Barisan Nasional (BN) national coalition to form state-based Sarawak Parties Alliance in light of the BN defeat in the 2018 Malaysian general election. He also started to enforce 5% sales tax on petroleum products in 2019 and asked Petronas, national oil and gas corporation wholly owned by the federal government to pay for the sales tax. Petronas refused to pay the sales tax and the case was brought to the high court. In March 2020, high court ruled that Sarawak has power to levy sales tax and Petronas is entitled to pay for it. In February 2022, Abang Johari passed a motion in state assembly to rename the chief minister post to "Premier". Such act received criticism from Dewan Bahasa dan Pustaka, a federal government agency of coordinating the usage of Malay language and conflicts of translation into Mandarin language between Chinese groups in Sarawak and Peninsular Malaysia.

Other countries relationship with Sarawak government
 Government of Singapore - as second main relationship and also main strategic partner with Sarawak government, after Government of Malaysia.
 Australian Government
 Government of the United Kingdom
 Government of Indonesia
 Government of Canada
 Government of South Korea
 Federal Government of Belgium
 Government of Spain

References

 
Politics of Sarawak